William Henry Kurtz (January 31, 1804 – June 24, 1868) was a Democratic member of the U.S. House of Representatives from Pennsylvania.

Early life
William H. Kurtz was born in York, Pennsylvania.  He attended the common schools and the York County Academy at York.  He studied law, was admitted to the bar on January 7, 1828, and commenced practice in York.

Career
He served as prosecuting attorney of York County, Pennsylvania.

Kurtz was elected as a Democrat to the Thirty-second and Thirty-third Congresses.  He served as chairman of the United States House Committee on Public Expenditures during the Thirty-third Congress. He resumed the practice of law.

Death
Kurtz died in York on June 24, 1868. He was interred in Prospect Hill Cemetery.

Footnotes

Sources

The Political Graveyard

1804 births
1868 deaths
Pennsylvania lawyers
Politicians from York, Pennsylvania
Democratic Party members of the United States House of Representatives from Pennsylvania
19th-century American politicians
19th-century American lawyers